Chief Chronicler of the Kingdom was a courtly position in the Kingdom of Portugal, formally instituted in 1434 by King Edward I. The Chief Chronicler was the official authority on Portuguese historiography, and the post was soon associated to the post of Keeper of the Royal Archives, already centralised in an autonomous way in the 1370s — a singularity in late medieval history in both its precocious creation and organisation.

The first to occupy the position was Fernão Lopes, in 1434. The last occupant was writer and politician Almeida Garrett, who was sacked in 1841, after fiercely criticising António José de Ávila (who was then Minister of the Exchequer), and no one was appointed to replace him. The following year, Minister of the Kingdom Costa Cabral issued a decree extinguishing the position of Chief Chronicler and transferring its responsibilities to the Keeper of the Royal Archives.

List of Chief Chroniclers of the Kingdom
The following list is sorted by date of appointment:
 1434 – Fernão Lopes
 1459 – Gomes Eanes de Zurara
 1484 – Vasco Fernandes de Lucena
 1497 – Rui de Pina
 1525 – Fernão de Pina
 1550 – D. António Pinheiro
 1599 – Francisco de Andrade
 1614 – Fr. Bernardo de Brito 
 1618 – João Baptista Lavanha
 1625 – D. Manuel de Meneses
 1630 – Fr. António Brandão 
 1644 – Fr. Francisco Brandão  
 1682 – Fr. Rafael de Jesus 
 1695 – José de Faria
 1709 – Fr. Bernardo de Castelo Branco 
 1726 – Fr.  
 1740 – Fr. Manuel da Rocha 
 1745 – Fr. António Botelho 
 1747 – Fr. José da Costa 
 1755 – Fr. António Caldeira 
 1784 – Fr. António da Mota 
 1807 – Fr. João Huet
 1822 – João Bernardo da Rocha Loureiro
 1823 – Fr. Cláudio da Conceição
 1835 – João Bernardo da Rocha Loureiro
 1838 – João Baptista de Almeida Garrett

References